The 2022 European Ladies' Team Championship took place 5–9 July at Conwy Golf Club in Conwy County Borough, Wales, United Kingdom. It was the 39th women's golf amateur European Ladies' Team Championship.

Venue 

Conwy Golf Club was formed in 1890. Its links course in Conwy County Borough, on the north coast of Wales, was designed by Jack Morris, club professional at Royal Liverpool Golf Club and nephew of Old Tom Morris, the first nine holes in 1875 and additional nine holes in 1895.

The club previously hosted the 2021 Curtis Cup and the men's 2009 European Amateur Team Championship.

Course layout
The scorecard shows the maximum hole lengths of the championship course set up. The length varied.

Format 
Each nation team consisted of six players. On the first two days each player played 18 holes of stroke play each day. The lowest five scores from each team's six players counted to the team total each day.

The eight best teams formed flight A, in knock-out match-play over the following three days. The teams were seeded based on their positions after the stroke play. The first placed team to play the quarter final against the eight placed team, the second against the seventh, the third against the sixth and the fourth against the fifth. Teams were allowed to use six players during the team matches, selecting four of them in the two morning foursome games and five players in to the afternoon single games. Teams knocked out after the quarter finals played one foursome game and four single games in each of their remaining matches. Extra holes were played in games that were all square after 18 holes. However, if the result of the team match were already decided, games are declared halved.

The eight teams placed 9-16 in the stroke-play stage formed flight B to also play knock-out match-play, but with one foursome game and four single games in each match, to decide their final positions.

The four teams placed 17-20 in the stroke-play stage formed flight C, to meet each other with one foursome game and four single games in each match, to decide their final positions.

Teams 
20 nation teams contested the event. Each team consisted of six players.

Players in the participating teams

Winners 
Defending champions team England lead the opening 36-hole qualifying competition, with a 22 over par score of  752, three strokes ahead of team Denmark.

Individual leader in the 36-hole stroke-play competition was, as well as at last years championship, Hannah Darling, Scotland, with a score of 6 under par 140, two strokes ahead of Emma Spitz, Austria.

Team England won the championship, beating Italy 4–2 in the final and earned their twelfth title. With the win, England increased its lead as the nation with most wins in the history of the championship, two more than Sweden.

Team Spain earned third place, beating Sweden 4-3 in the bronze match.

Results 
Qualification round

Team standings after first round

Team standings after final qualifying round 

* Note: In the event of a tie the order was determined by thebest total of the two non-counting scores of the two rounds.

Individual leaders

 Note: There was no official award for the lowest individual score.

Flight A

Bracket

Final games

* Note: Game declared halved, since team match already decided.

Flight B

Bracket

Flight C

Team matches

Team standings

Final standings

See also 

 Espirito Santo Trophy – biennial world amateur team golf championship for women organized by the International Golf Federation.
 European Amateur Team Championship – European amateur team golf championship for men organised by the European Golf Association.
 European Ladies Amateur Championship – European amateur individual golf championship for women organised by the European Golf Association.

References

External links 
European Golf Association: Results

European Ladies' Team Championship
Golf tournaments in Wales
International sports competitions hosted by Wales
European Ladies' Team Championship
European Ladies' Team Championship
European Ladies' Team Championship